The 23rd Sikh Pioneers were a regiment of the British Indian Army. They could trace their origins to 1857, when they were known as the 15th (Pioneer) Regiment of Punjab Infantry.
The regiment recruited the Mazhabi Sikhs and Ramdasia Sikhs  of Punjab province.
Despite being Pioneers by name, the regiment was specially trained as Assault Pioneers.

Brief History
They took part in the Battle of Taku Forts (1858), the Battle of Taku Forts (1860) and the Battle of Palikao in the Second Opium War. This was followed by the 1868 Expedition to Abyssinia a punitive expedition carried out by the armed forces of the British Empire against the Ethiopian Empire and Emperor Tewodros II of Ethiopia.
They next took part in the Battle of Peiwar Kotal, the Battle of Charasiab in the Second Afghan War in 1878. In 1903, they took part in the British expedition to Tibet an invasion of Tibet by British Indian forces, seeking to prevent the Russian Empire from interfering in Tibetan affairs.

After World War I, the Indian government reformed the army moving from single battalion regiments to multi battalion regiments. In 1922, the 23rd Sikh Pioneers now became the 1st Battalion, 3rd Sikh Pioneers, they were renamed again in 1929, as the Corps of Sikh Pioneers, which was disbanded in 1933. During the Second World War the regiment was reformed and named the Sikh Light Infantry. This regiment was allocated to the new Indian Army after independence.

Colonels of the regiment

His Majesty King Edward VII - Colonel-in-Chief 1904

Previous names
23rd Bengal Native Infantry - 1861
23rd (Punjab) Bengal Native Infantry (Pioneers) - 1864
23rd (Punjab) Bengal Infantry (Pioneers) - 1885
23rd Punjab Pioneers - 1901

References

British Indian Army infantry regiments
Military units and formations established in 1857
1857 establishments in India